The Calanque de Port-Miou is one of the three big Cassis calanques. It is very long and narrow, and thus was very suitable for establishing a marina.

The name Port-Miou is an approximate transcription in French orthography of the Occitan Pòrt-Melhor (the "best port") which is locally pronuncied /pwɔʁ.mi.ju/.

History 
Port-Miou was for a long time a seigniory in its own right, dependent on the Maison des Baux. On April 4, 1402, in Brantes, at the foot of Ventoux, in the presence of his wife Alix des Baux, Odon de Villars donated to his nephew Philippe de Lévis the fiefs of Brantes, Plaisians and their dependencies, the seigneuries of Saint-Marcel, Roquefort, Le Castellet, Cassis and Port-Miou, dependent on the barony of Aubagne, as well as La Fare-les-Oliviers, and Éguilles. His nephew, in return, was to serve as a surety vis-à-vis Raymond de Turenne in the observation of an agreement made between the viscount, him and his wife Alix. In the event of non-compliance on the part of Alix and Odon, the latter would have to pay 50,000 florins to Raymond de Turenne.

External links 
Official site

References 

Landforms of Provence-Alpes-Côte d'Azur
Cliffs of Metropolitan France
Massif des Calanques